Carbinea is a genus of Australian sheetweb spiders that was first described by V. T. Davies in 1999.

Species
 it contains four species, found in Queensland:
Carbinea breviscapa Davies, 1999 – Australia (Queensland)
Carbinea longiscapa Davies, 1999 (type) – Australia (Queensland)
Carbinea robertsi Davies, 1999 – Australia (Queensland)
Carbinea wunderlichi Davies, 1999 – Australia (Queensland)

See also
 List of Stiphidiidae species

References

Araneomorphae genera
Spiders of Australia
Stiphidiidae
Taxa named by Valerie Todd Davies